is a railway station in the town of Aga, Higashikanbara District, Niigata Prefecture, Japan, operated by East Japan Railway Company (JR East).

Lines

Station layout
The station consists of one side platform serving a single bi-directional track. The station is unattended.

History
The station opened on 10 January 1953. With the privatization of Japanese National Railways (JNR) on 1 April 1987, the station came under the control of JR East. A new station building was completed in 1995.

Surrounding area
 
 Higashi-Gejō Post Office

See also
 List of railway stations in Japan

External links
 JR East station information 

Railway stations in Niigata Prefecture
Ban'etsu West Line
Railway stations in Japan opened in 1953
Aga, Niigata